Vladìmir Anísimoff (born 14 March 1950 in Leningrad, USSR) is a Russian composer, scientist-physicist, philosopher-agnostic, writer, and philanthropist. He is a grandnephew of the revolutionary-menshevik Vasily Anisimoff and a grandnephew of the famous Soviet pedagogue Pyotr Afanasiev, who created the most popular in the young Soviet Russia ABC book in Russian language "Read, write, count" (24 editions) and the Russian language Textbook for primary school. Vladìmir Anísimoff is famous as a scientist in the field of magnetic resonance. He developed a method for the study of hidden internal surfaces, as well as he worked in the field of magnetic resonance imaging, in particular, in the study of membranes. He is also known as the author of rare duration and depth of the content of the Symphony "FrognerPark". This Symphony is similar to sculptural FrognerPark of Gustav Vigeland in Oslo and reflects a full range of feelings and emotions of a person during his life. "Unicum Organum" is his fundamental philosophical work in the understanding of human life as a continuous process of information processing by chemical processors of brain.

Biography

Early Years 
Vladimir Anisimoff was born on 14 March 1950 in Leningrad, USSR in the family of a construction engineer Victor Anisimoff, the nephew of the famous Russian revolutionary Vasily Anisimoff. He received an excellent private and public education in the Soviet period in Russia.

Vladimir Anisimoff since childhood was fond of music, and especially music composition, but on the advice of his parents, he first received higher education in engineering.

Simultaneously, he studied choral conducting at the Rimsky-Korsakov Music College for adults in Saint-Petersburg.

Scientific Activity 
Vladimir Anisimoff started his research in the field of magnetic resonance in the early 1970s under the leadership of Professors Alexander Belonogov and Dmitry Dianov in Saint Petersburg State Electrotechnical University. In 1980, he received the degree of doctor of philosophy (Saint Petersburg State Electrotechnical University and Saint Petersburg State University, the opponent was a professor of Saint Petersburg State University Vladimir Shutilov), and continued his studies in cooperation with the academician Nikolay Emanuel. After the sudden death of Nikolay Emanuel in 1984, Vladimir Anisimoff continued his research under the guidance of the academician Anatoly Buchachenko. In 1989, Anatoly Buchachenko presented Vladimir Anisimoff to the defense of the second (as it is accepted in Russia) doctoral thesis.

For 20 years, Vladimir Anisimoff has published about 50 scientific works.

Main Scientific Works 
 V.L. Komashnja, V.V. Anisimoff. "Quadrupole & Hexadecapole 27Al nuclei transitions studies in leucosapphire", Journal of Molecular Structure. Amsterdam, 83(1982), p. 391
 V.V. Anisimoff, presented by academician N. Emanuel "Lines of magnetic resonance of protons of water in microemulsions", Reports of Academy of Sciences. Moscow, 266, N 2(1982), p. 374
 V.V. Anisimoff, "Magnetic resonance methods in research of processes on surfaces" (great overview of the present status of these studies), Surface. Moscow, N 9 (1984), p. 5

Business and Philanthropy 
During perestroika (1986–2000), Vladimir Anisimoff had to get a new education – broker on the currency exchange. In 1993, Vladimir Anisimoff organized a joint-stock company "New Company of Investors" NCI corp.. It served production garages for the population, and a full range of printing services.

At the same time, as the President of the NCI corp., Vladimir Anisimoff organized together with his friend the composer Alexander Sledin regular concerts on Ostrovsky square in St. Petersburg in Hall of St. Petersburg state theatre library, which played music of modern composers of St. Petersburg. The concerts were carried out regularly over four seasons from 1993 to 1997.

Since 2005, Vladimir Anisimoff financially assisted the organization of many concerts of famous St. Petersburg bands both in Russia and abroad. In particular, for some time, he supported the Horn Orchestra of Russia.

In the period from 2001 to 2003, the  NCI corp. has undergone capture raid on the part of power structures of St. Petersburg. According to the opinion of the composer, Alexander Sledin "It came under the control of people who had no connection to either philanthropy or to the understanding of human relations between people".

From 2010, Vladimir Anisimoff retired and devoted his life to composing and writing.

In 2009, Vladimir Anisimoff founded a new type of Philharmonic – the Virtual International Philharmonic.

Music 
Vladimir Anisimoff has begun his studies of composition at the Seminar of Amateur composers in the class of Johann Admoni in 1971, and completed them with the professor Joseph Pustylnik in 1980.

Main Musical Works 
 Symphony no.1 "Analysis and Synthesis" op.14, 1975, final edition – 2011
 Symphony no.2 "FROGNERPARK" op.without number, 1991
 Symphony no.3 "SINFONIA PICCOLA" op.33, 2004
 Chamber music, in particular, – "Traffic sing", poems by Konstantin Vanshenkin (op.2,1972), "Andante cantabile" for violin & piano(op.12, 1975), "Sonata for the piano" (op.6,1973), "Chaconne" for string quartet (op.11, 1974), "Space ways" for oboe, fagotto & computer (2005) and many others
 Musical "Only, Only Ready Cash" (in Russian "Чистоган")(op. 29, 2003–2010, the musical was written about the period of perestroika, it was censored and excluded from the plan of the theater's performances)

Discography 
 Альбом "Владимир Анисимов, Камерная музыка", Петербургская студия грамзаписи, Санкт-Петербург, 1999
 Album "Sounds are stars...",Symphonic and chamber music, the Horn Orchestra of Russia, conductor Serge Polyanichko, ASE Studio, (exclusive release, limited edition), St. Petersburg, 2012

Philosophy 
After Vladimir Anisimoff has become known in the scholar field, in 2005, he decided to summarize his knowledge in the philosophical work "Unicum Organum" that was officially published in 2019.

He has consistently promoted the ideas of Immanuel Kant about the unknowable essence of the matter.

Published 
 Vladimir Anisimoff, "Unicum Organum: The only key to the World mysteries". Amazon Publishing, 93 pages, (2019)

Fiction 
Since 2004, Vladimir Anisimoff was fond of writing funny stories. He finds himself in these simple stories about everything he sees around him. In 2013, he retired and devoted his time to writing books and blogging, mostly in the fields of science fiction and philosophy. He also works on translations of popular books to the Russian language.

Published 
 Vladimir Anisimoff, "Neither..., Nor..." SMART stories. Amazon Publishing, 111 pages, (2012)
 Vladimir Anisimoff, "The Encoding Shift" Philosophical Science Fiction. Amazon Publishing, 176 pages, (2020)

Personal life 
Vladimir Anisimoff married (1975) the cousin of the famous Soviet actress Marina Neyolova Nina Ivanova (Neyolova at her mother). He has two adult children. His son Dmitry Anisimov defended his PhD in USI, Lugano, Switzerland, in the group of the well-known scientist Kai Hormann and now lives and works in Nice, France.

Links 
 Composer Vladimir Anisimoff – listen, download in mp3
 Vladimir Anisimoff as composer-founder of the club "Melos"
 Composer Vladimir Anisimoff on Virtual International Philharmonic
  Composer Vladimir Anisimoff on Canadian Musiccentre (CMC)
 Composer Vladimir Anisimoff as member of Russian Tradition Association

Note 

1950 births
Living people
Russian composers
Russian male composers
Russian physicists
Writers from Saint Petersburg
Russian agnostics
Russian pacifists
Philosophers of science
Russian philanthropists
Businesspeople from Saint Petersburg